The Clarkson Golden Knights women's ice hockey program represented Clarkson University during the 2020–21 NCAA Division I women's ice hockey season. The program posted its first losing season since the 2010–11 Clarkson Golden Knights women's ice hockey season, recording eight wins, compared to 10 losses and one tie.

Offseason

Recruiting

Regular season

Standings

Schedule
Source:

|-
!colspan=12 style="  "| Regular Season
|-

|-
!colspan=12 style=""| ECAC Tournament
|-

Roster

2020-21 Golden Knights
Current as of 2020–2021 season

Awards and honors
Marie-Pier Coulombe, ECAC Goaltender of the Week (awarded February 9)
Elizabeth Giguere, ECAC Player of the Week (awarded February 9)
Elizabeth Giguere, Top 10 Finalist for the Patty Kazmaier Award
Caitrin Lonergan, Top 10 Finalist for the Patty Kazmaier Award
Caitrin Lonergan, All-USCHO.com Second Team
Michelle Pasiechnyk, Rookie of the Month by Hockey Commissioners Association (January 2021)

ECAC Monthly Awards
Caitrin Lonergan, ECAC Army ROTC Player of the Month (January 2021)
Michelle Pasiechnyk, ECAC MAC Goaltending Goalie of the Month (January 2021)

ECAC Weekly Awards

References

Clarkson
Clarkson Golden Knights women's ice hockey seasons